Oskari Wilho Louhivuori (18 September 1884 – 1 July 1953) was a Finnish politician, born in Kuopion maalaiskunta. He was a member of the Senate of Finland.

1884 births
1953 deaths
People from Kuopio
People from Kuopio Province (Grand Duchy of Finland)
Finnish Party politicians
National Coalition Party politicians
Finnish senators
Members of the Parliament of Finland (1917–19)
People of the Finnish Civil War (White side)